Hoover is the Anglicized version of the German and Dutch surname Huber, originally designating a landowner or a prosperous small farmer. Notable people with the surname include:

 Alice Hoover (1928–2014), All-American Girls Professional Baseball League player
 Bob Hoover (1922–2016), airshow and test pilot, author
 Brad Hoover (born 1976), American football fullback
 Charles Franklin Hoover (1865–1927), American physician
 Colleen Hoover (born 1979), American author
 Dave Hoover (1955–2011), American comic book  artist and animator
 Dave Hoover (American football), American football coach
 Dick Hoover (baseball) (1925–1981), American Major League Baseball player
 Dick Hoover (1929–2009), American professional bowler
 Dorothy Haines Hoover (1904–1995), Canadian artist
 Erna Schneider Hoover (born 1926), inventor of the computerized telephone switching system
 Helen Hoover, American nature writer 
 Herbert Hoover (1874–1964), 31st president of the United States
 Herbert Hoover Jr. (1903–1969), the son of President Herbert Hoover; a successful engineer and businessman
 Herb Hoover (1912–1952), American test pilot
 J. Edgar Hoover (1895–1972), longest-serving head of the Federal Bureau of Investigation
 John Hoover (baseball) (1962–2014), American Major League Baseball pitcher
 John H. Hoover (1887–1970), U.S. Navy Admiral who served in World War II
 Katherine Hoover (1937–2018), US composer and flutist
 Lamar Hoover (1887–1944), American college sports coach
 Larry Hoover (born 1950), leader of the Gangster Disciples street gang
 Lou Henry Hoover (1874–1944), wife of President Herbert Hoover
 M. Herbert Hoover (died 1952), American politician (who is not related to the 31st president of the United States)
 Margaret Hoover (born 1977), American political consultant and commentator, great-granddaughter of the former president 
 Natalie Hoover (born 1989), voice actress
 Nathan Hoover (born 1997), American basketball player
 Paul Hoover (poet) (born 1946), American poet
 Paul Hoover (baseball) (born 1976), American Major League Baseball catcher
 Quinton Kyle Hoover (born 1996), American YouTuber, known for the channel Quinton Reviews
 Robert Francis Hoover (1913–1970), botanist; see Brodiaea appendiculata
 Stevin Hoover (born 1948), former Boston-based investment manager
 William Henry "Boss" Hoover (1849–1932), founder of The Hoover Company

Characters
 Robert Hoover, from the movie Animal House
 Elizabeth Hoover (Miss Hoover), fictional school teacher from the US TV series The Simpsons; See List of recurring The Simpsons characters
 Walter Hoover, in James Curtis's novel They Drive by Night
 Walter Hoover, played by Ernest Thesiger in the film adaptation They Drive by Night
 Dwayne Hoover, in Kurt Vonnegut's novel Breakfast of Champions
  Bertolt Hoover (also spelled as Bertholdt Hoover), in Hajime Isayama's Manga/Anime Attack on Titan
Hoover, an agent of the Grail in Garth Ennis and Steve Dillon's comic series Preacher

See also
 Hoover (disambiguation)

References